Necronomicon is a German thrash metal band.

History
Necronomicon was founded in 1983 by band leader Volker "Freddy" Fredrich, Axel Strickstrock and
Lars "Lala" Honeck. The band originally played punk rock, so in 1981 "Freddy" founded Total Rejection. This early Necronomicon phase was influenced by bands including Discharge, The Exploited and GBH. Through the influence of Motörhead, Metallica and Slayer, their musical style soon would turn more into heavy metal.

In 1985, the quartet signed their first record contract at GAMA Records. That was one year before guitarist Jürgen "Jogi" Weltin was recruited. The band released their debut album Necronomicon, still dressed in punk outfits on the cover. With a mixture of hard thrash with strong punk rock influences, they gained notoriety in the underground scene.

In 1987, the second album, Apocalyptic Nightmare, was put on the market. On an Eastern Bloc tour that began in Austria and Hungary, the former Czechoslovakia to Russia, Necronomicon gained a large following.

In the late 1980s the German thrash metal reached its peak period. Bands such as Kreator, Sodom and Destruction with "Freddy's" childhood friend Schmier attended national and international sensation. But Necronomicon had less success in this regard due to some major setbacks: After 1988, when the third album was released at Escalation GAMA Records, it came to financial inconsistencies on the part of the label. Necronomicon then separated from the management. As the label threatened with a legal dispute, the band agreed to give up their complete rights to the songs along with the band name for ten years. Necronomicon was also obligated to not sign another record contract.

In 1993 Necronomicon was able to sign a new record deal. The embargo time of ten years, which was enforced by GAMA Records, had now been successfully challenged. But the joy of the new contract, now with D&S Records, lasted only briefly. Although the album Screams was still mixed in 1994 under new management, D&S Records surprisingly reported insolvency in the same year and broke all contact with the band. In addition, a fire destroyed the rehearsal room and a portion of the equipment. Necronomicon almost broke up.

In early 2000, a thrash revival broke out on the international music scene. Bands such as Destruction and Exodus went on tour again and produced new albums. Also Necronomicon found success in March 2004 when the band completed a contract with the label Remedy Records (Germany) from Hamburg and the new CD named Construction of Evil was brought to the market. But before that, the long-standing collaboration with guitarist Jogi had to be stopped because of his tinnitus.

In 2007 Necronomicon signed a contract with the Spanish label Xtreem Music. The album Revenge of the Beast appeared. The CD was recorded as a special edition with a rougher mix of classic retro 1980s thrash in Neuenburg am Rhein.
The European Tour in 2009 led to Greece, Spain and over to Russia. Drummer and founding member Axel Strickstrock resigned and was replaced by Klaus Enderlin.

By the end of June 2013, Necronomicon was looking for permanent members to play the guitar and the bass. Benjamin "Ben Jay" Rogg and Marco Lohrenz completed Necronomicon's line-up. In this new formation Necronomicon played its first gig in the Czech Republic at the Aggressive Music Fest 2013 which was a success for the new line-up.

On 27 November 2015, the band released their album Pathfinder... Between Heaven and Hell on German label Trollzorn Records. Then came the album Invictus, which won the title of "Album Of The Month" on the Metallian.com webzine.

Musical style
Originally Necronomicon was a punk rock band, so the first demo recording Total Rejection reflects that style. Due to the influence of Motörhead, Metallica and Slayer a synthesis of the old style and the new metal influences was created. The band's style in the mid-1980s was described by the online magazine Metalize.Me as a mixture of Hellhammer and Sodom. In 1987 "Freddy" reported disappointment with the album Apocalyptic Nightmare: "The songs are good, but the musicians haven't been mature enough to implement it adequately". Construction of Evil (2004) was described by Martin of heavy Metal.de as "...fairly classical Heavy Metal of the old school and up-tempo power metal without prolonged double base-storm...". Musically, the band had remained faithful. The seventh album Invictus (2012), combines the 1980s style with contemporary elements. Metalize.Me said it sounds "...charming to rumble metal, but it does not rumble anymore...it's now played accurately...“. Martin of heavy Metal.de said that "Freddy's" rough vocals are a specific feature of the band and because of that Necronomicon stands out of the mass of power and heavy metal bands in Germany."

Discography

Studio albums
 1985: Necronomicon
 1987: Apocalyptic Nightmare (Gama-Records)
 1988: Escalation (Gama-Records)
 1994: Screams (D & S Records)
 2004: Construction of Evil (Remedy-Records)
 2008: Revenge of the Beast (Xtreem Music)
 2012: Invictus (Massacre Records)
 2015: Pathfinder... Between Heaven and Hell
 2018: Unleashed Bastards (El Puerto Records)
 2021: The Final Chapter

Demos
 1985: Total Rejection
 1985: Blind Destruction
 1992: Lucky Strikes
 2000: Possessed Again!

Splits
 1986: Break Out - German Metal Tracks No.2

References

External links
 
 

German thrash metal musical groups